Dioses y perros is a 2014 Spanish drama film directed by David Marqués and Rafael Montesinos. It stars Hugo Silva and Megan Montaner.

Plot 
A drama tinged with black humor elements, the plot tracks the plight of Pasca, a man from Vallecas working as a boxing sparring and also taking care of his younger brother Toni. Pasca develops a relation with Adela, a lively young teacher and newcomer to the neighborhood.

Cast

Production 
The screenplay is based on a story by Jaime Martínez Balmaseda. It was penned by David Marqués and Rafael Calatayud Cano. Dioses y perros is a Nadie es Perfecto PC production, and it had support from ICAA, IVAC, Canal Nou and Audiovisual SGR. Filming wrapped on 4 October 2013. Shooting locations included Valencia and Madrid.

Release 
The film was presented at the Málaga Film Festival on 25 March 2014. Distributed by Festival Films, it was theatrically released in Spain on 10 October 2014.

Reception 
Andrea G. Bermejo of Cinemanía rated the film 3 out of 5 stars, writing that the film simply "dives into the shit of its characters" to bring some humor, gaining in originality with the romantic plot pertaining Megan Montaner, who performs a "credible" posh woman from Cantabria. Summing it up, Bermejo underscored the film to be a "tragicomedy with punch".

Mirito Torreiro of Fotogramas also rated it 3 out of 5 stars, considering that, despite seemingly having everything it takes to be a small masterpiece, the film "does not quite come together because of an ending that is not only predictable, but also very improvable".

See also 
 List of Spanish films of 2014

References 

Films shot in Valencia
Films shot in Madrid
Films set in Madrid
2014 drama films
Spanish drama films
2010s Spanish-language films
Spanish boxing films
2010s Spanish films